Agriculture in Suriname is the third largest industry in Suriname, in the economy, employing between 9-15% percent of the workforce, and account for 9% of GDP.  Agriculture accounts for 40% of carbon emissions in Suriname, and is an important part of Suriname's policies as part of its Nationally Determined Contributions.

Major crops 
In 2018, Suriname produced 273 thousand tons of rice, 125 thousand tons of sugar cane, in addition to smaller productions of other agricultural products, such as banana (48 thousand tons), orange (19 thousand tons) and coconut (14 thousand tons).

Only 0.4 percent of Suriname's total land area is cultivable, with half of this devoted to rice production, which makes up around 10 percent of Suriname's total exports, with 180,000 tons produced in 1999.  The banana industry also accounts for 2.5 percent of total export revenues, with  produced in 1999. Suriname also produces palm kernels, coconuts, sugar, plantains, peanuts, beef, chicken and shrimp. In the 18th century the production of coffee was of major importance under the Dutch colony but has gradually declined.

Since 1945, the Commission for the Application of Mechanized Techniques to Agriculture in Suriname has successfully brought new land under cultivation and redeveloped old plantations and improved the total agricultural production. Under union pressure, the government in early 1987 agreed to a national sugar plan to make production more efficient, and to create employment. The sugar industry is of major note in Guyana, especially the operations of Guyana Sugar Corporation since 1976, with  90,000 tons produced in 1999.

Fishing, especially for shellfish, is also important with wild-harvest shrimp accounting for US$29 million, or 6.7 percent of all exports in 1998 and the fishing industry overall creating annual revenues worth US$40–50 million. In October 2000, the industry was disrupted when a ban was imposed on Suriname's aquaculture products because of high levels of toxic residues.

References

External links
Agricultural yields of Suriname